Abdul Razack Cissé (born 30 December 1998) is an Ivorian footballer who plays for Egyptian Premier League side NBE SC, as a winger.
He was a member of the Ivory Coast national under-20 football team at the 2017 Jeux de la Francophonie.

References

External links
 

1998 births
Living people
Ivorian footballers
Association football wingers
Egyptian Premier League players
Ivorian expatriate footballers
Expatriate footballers in Egypt
Aswan SC players
Zamalek SC players
Al Ittihad Alexandria Club players